Doratulina is a genus of leafhoppers belonging to the family Cicadellidae, subfamily Deltocephalinae, tribe Stenometopiini.

References
 Zahniser & Nielson, 2012. An extraordinary new genus and three new species of Acostemmini (Hemiptera: Cicadellidae: Deltocephalinae) from Madagascar with comments on the morphology and classification of the tribe. - Zootaxa 3209: 28–52

Deltocephalinae
Cicadellidae genera
Insects of Madagascar